Scott Edward George Bishop  is a Canadian naval flag officer serving as a Vice Admiral in the Royal Canadian Navy. He presently serves as Canada's Military Representative to the NATO Military Committee, and was commander of the Canadian Forces Intelligence Command from 2016 to 2021.

Background 
Bishop joined the Royal Canadian Naval Reserve in 1983 before joining the Regular Force in 1985. His first regular post was as a bridge watch-keeping officer on HMCS Restigouche. Bishop specialized in navigation, and served as the Navigating Officer in Royal Canadian Naval ships Chignecto, Miramichi, Qu'appelle, and Provider. He was also the Senior Navigation Instructor at the Naval Officer Training Centre. In 1995, Bishop was promoted to the rank of Lieutenant-Commander and posted to HMCS Vancouver as the ship's Combat Officer. In 2000, he was appointed Executive Officer of HMCS Athabaskan. He was selected to command the frigate  in 2005.

He holds a Bachelor of Business Administration and Master of Business Administration, and is a graduate of the United States Naval War College.

Staff career 
Bishop served as the Commander of Maritime Operations Group Five, the Commander Canadian Fleet Pacific in August 2012 and the Commander Canadian Fleet Atlantic in 2013. 

He was the Director General for International Security Policy from July 2015 until assuming command of the Canadian Forces Intelligence Command in June 2016, which he led for five years. 

In 2021, upon the appointment of Lieutenant General Frances J. Allen as Vice Chief of the Defence Staff, he was promoted to Vice Admiral and appointed Canada's NATO Military Representative. He presented his credentials to NATO Secretary-General Jens Stoltenberg and Chairman of the NATO Military Committee Chairman, Admiral Rob Bauer, in June of 2021.

Awards and decorations

Bishop's personal awards and decorations include the following:

105px

 Command Commendation

References

Year of birth missing (living people)
Living people
Commanders of the Order of Military Merit (Canada)
Canadian admirals
Canadian military personnel from British Columbia
Royal Canadian Navy officers